The Aberdeen University Conservative and Unionist Association (AUCUA) is a student Conservative association formed in 1881. It is the third oldest Conservative student association in the United Kingdom.

It comprises an executive committee that consists of six positions where members are elected annually at the association's AGM. It is directly affiliated to the Scottish Conservative and Unionist Party and the Aberdeen University Students' Association.

Notable former members

 Lord Blencathra - Member of the House of Lords, former Member of Parliament for the Penrith constituency, Minister of State for Home Affairs, Minister of State for the Environment and Countryside and Chief Whip of the Conservative Party. 
 James Cran - Former Member of Parliament for Beverley and Shadow Deputy Leader of the House.
Murdo Fraser MSP – Member of the Scottish Parliament for Mid Scotland and Fife and Shadow Cabinet Secretary for Covid Recovery
Dr Nanette Milne - Former Member of the Scottish Parliament for North East Scotland. 
 Dr David Torrance – Author, contemporary historian, freelance political journalist.
 Derek Brownlee - Former MSP for South of Scotland (Scottish Parliament electoral region) and member of the Advisory Board of Reform Scotland.
 Dr Eamonn Butler - Co-founder of the Adam Smith Institute.
 Andrew Bowie MP - Member of Parliament for West Aberdeenshire and Kincardine and former Deputy Chair of the Conservative Party
 Finlay Carson MSP - Member of the Scottish Parliament for Galloway and West Dumfries and Convener of the Rural Affairs, Islands and Natural Environment Committee.
 Ross Thomson - Former Member of Parliament for Aberdeen South and former Member of the Scottish Parliament for North East Scotland.
 Paul Wheelhouse - Former Scottish National Party Member of the Scottish Parliament for South Scotland and Scottish Government Minister for Energy, Connectivity and the Islands.

Chairmen  
 2022/23 - Eitan Godsi/Marco Oosthuizen
 2021/22 - Nestor Carlsen-Devereux
 2020/21 - Rami Jerrow
 2019/20 - Joshua Mills
 2018/19 - Gavin MacKenzie
 2017/18 - Emma Farquhar
 2016/17 - Emma Farquhar
 2015/16 - Alexander McNab
 2014/15 - Nicholas Layden
 2013/14 - Nicholas Layden
 2012/13 - Andrew Bowie
 2011/12 - Declan Pang
 2010/11 - Duncan Stewart
 2009/10 - Andrea Sharpe
 2008/09 - Oliver Lash-Williams
 2007/08 - Leslie K. Clark
 2006/07 - Tobias Lebmann
 2005/06 - Tobias Lehmann
 2004/05 - Frank Webster

Current Committee 

 Chairmen - Marco Oosthuizen and Eitan Godsi
 Vice President - Zak Parsons
 Treasurer - Haytham Alrifai
 Social Secretary - Chris Hempton
 Social Media Secretary - Adam Taylor

Media 
Members of the association have, in recent years, been interviewed by various news outlets such as euronews, Sky News and BBC Newsnight. They also maintain an active relationship with the Aberdeen University Student Newspaper 'The Gaudie' and regularly provide speakers to the Aberdeen Student Radio for discussion and debate.

See also 
Glasgow University Conservative Association
Oxford University Conservative Association
Cambridge University Conservative Association
Scottish Young Conservatives

 
Student political organizations
Conservative
Aberdeen